The 2018 Chicago Red Stars season was the team's tenth season and sixth season in the National Women's Soccer League, the top tier of women's soccer in the United States. For the fourth consecutive season, the team qualified for the post-season playoffs and lost in the semi-final, as they were defeated by the North Carolina Courage 2–0.

Team roster

2018 squad

Player transactions

College draft
 Source: National Women's Soccer League

Transfers in

Transfer out

Off-season loans
After the 2018 season several Chicago Red Stars players were loaned to clubs of W-League, Australia to play in their 2018-2019 season.

Management and staff
Front office
 Owner: Arnim Whisler
Coaching Staff
Manager: Rory Dames
Assistant Coach: Craig Harrington
Assistant Coach: Gary Curneen
Goalkeeper Coach: Jordi King
Strength & Conditioning Coach: Evan Johnson
Volunteer Assistant Coach: Brian Kibler

Competitions

League standing

Weekly ranking

Update September 8, 2018 Source: NWSL 2018 season

Results summary

National Women's Soccer League

Preseason

Regular season

Postseason

Honors and awards

NWSL annual awards

NWSL Player of the Month

NWSL Team of the Month

NWSL Player of the Week

NWSL Goal of the Week

NWSL Save of the Week

References

Match reports (preseason)

Match reports (regular season)

Match report (postseason playoff)

Notes

External links 

 

2018
Chicago Red Stars
Chicago Red Stars
Chicago Red Stars